A Pillow Case of Mystery II (Traditional Chinese: 施公奇案II; literally The Curious Cases of Lord Sze II) is a 2010 Hong Kong detective-fantasy television drama starring Bobby Au-yeung as the title character, Mr. Sze (Sze Sai-lun).

Produced by Lam Chi-wah and edited by Lee Yee-wah and Choi Suk-yin, the drama is a direct sequel to A Pillow Case of Mystery. The original broadcast for this sequel was on the TVB Jade network with 45-minute episodes airing five days a week from 31 January to 6 August 2010. The two-hour finale was aired on Saturday, 7 August 2010.

Synopsis
After a radical change in life, Sze Sai-lun becomes dispirited with the political world and spends most of his time travelling around in search of fun. Along the way, he meets a spirit medium, Ng Kwan-yau, who somehow gets caught up in a mysterious murder case. With fortuitous assistance from the pillow spirit Ngau Tai-lik, he is able to crack the case and prove Kwan-yau’s innocence. Sai-lun has his confidence back and pledges to continue his fight for justice. As time progresses, Sai-lun and Kwan-yau get to know each other better and gradually fall in love. Sai-lun finally decides to get over the past and marry the girl. He enjoys his married life so much but gets frustrated at work sometimes - Tai-lik’s power turns out not to be as strong as expected, which ends up with a lot of misleading clues being given. Amidst the various challenges of his new life, Sai-lun realizes that Kwan-yau seems to have something to hide and that there is a malicious plot behind their marriage. Knowing that the couple have fallen out, Sai-lun’s mother has found him a new wife, Luk Siu-tip. Out of the blue, Siu-tip has also come with ill intentions. Sai-lun is plunged into a complex web of intrigue and things seem to be getting on top of him…

Cast and characters

Main characters

Recurring characters

Other characters

The swordfish murder case

The undergarment theft case

The painting theft case

The drama murder case

The family genocide case

The serial rapist murder case

Pillow spirit and Mystery Bay case

Viewership ratings

Awards and nominations

TVB Anniversary Awards 2010
 Nominated: Best Drama
 Nominated: Best Actor (Bobby Au Yeung)
 Nominated: Best Actress (Jessica Hsuan)

References

External links
TVB.com A Pillow Case of Mystery II - Official Website 
K for TVB Episode Synopsis
Batgwa.com: News on Costume Fitting

TVB dramas
2010 Hong Kong television series debuts
2010 Hong Kong television series endings
Gong'an television series